In enzymology, a pyruvate oxidase (CoA-acetylating) is an enzyme that catalyzes the chemical reaction

pyruvate + CoA + O2  acetyl-CoA + CO2 + H2O2

The 3 substrates of this enzyme are pyruvate, CoA, and O2, whereas its 3 products are acetyl-CoA, CO2, and H2O2.

This enzyme belongs to the family of oxidoreductases, specifically those acting on the aldehyde or oxo group of donor with oxygen as acceptor.  The systematic name of this enzyme class is pyruvate:oxygen 2-oxidoreductase (CoA-acetylating). This enzyme participates in pyruvate metabolism.  It employs one cofactor, FAD.

References

 
 

EC 1.2.3
Flavoproteins
Enzymes of unknown structure